Anouar Hajoui (born 6 May 1971), better known as DJ Cut Killer or simply Cut Killer, is a Moroccan-born French DJ and record producer with a versatile repertoire of hip hop music.

He enjoys international fame and mixed in United States of America through invitations by DJ Big Dawg Pitbulls of Funkmaster Flex and Shadyville DJ's of rapper 50 Cent. For more than fifteen years, he has been one of the most emblematic DJs in French hip hop.

Biography 
Anouar Hajoui as a young Parisian who loved music and a frenzied activist embraced wholeheartedly the emerging Parisian movement. He joined IZB, the first association to promote the hip-hop and organize concerts, and put down scratches on Original MC's 1991 album. He performed a memorable role as himself in a scene from the cult movie La Haine. He was a DJ for MC Solaar's concerts, scratcher on IAM member Akhenaton's solo album, and a radio show on Radio Nova.

Career 
In the middle of the 1990s, Cut Killer had already become a well-respected and active DJ. He adapted and consolidated New York hip-hop in France through many of his mix tapes, mixing the latest releases and freestyles of French rap, they became favorites and collectors' items. His dynamic mixes, his smartness to catch the best 12 inches before anyone, and his flair to find local rappers made his mix-tapes important. The big number of top brass of the second generation of French rap went through this: Sages Poètes de la Rue, Lunatic, 113 and many others. The Hip Hop Soul Party series, composed of double mixed CDs, started in 1996 at MCA's. From the second volume on, exclusive tracks began to appear from Fabe, Busta Flex, among others, with one CD dedicated to hip-hop, the other to R&B. In volume three, a CD was dedicated to international hip-hop, the other to French hip-hop.

Killer, after the death of his rapper mate East established a label called Double H (for Hip-Hop) as a merchandising company and then a production label. In a few years, HH became one of the most influential independent labels on the market. When shifting from Universal to Small (Sony), the Hip-Hop Soul Party project became the Cut Killer Show with a first double CD published in 1997 (containing an outro by Jamel Debbouze), followed in 1998 by Operation Freestyle, a record fully dedicated to French underground. In 1999, Cut Killer and his associates produced R&B 2000, the collective album Double H DJ Crew, but also highly respected artists such as Fabe, Doudou Masta and 113, who managed to make their album Les Princes de la Ville a platinum record to end up winning two "Victoires de la Musique" (French music awards) in 2000. Double H is still developing with a team of street marketing, a clothing line "HH Wear", a publishing company called "Eastory Editions", followed by another production and publishing label "Eastory Production". Besides, Killer is booked by Chaos Prod agency, created by his brother Chakri.

As The Hip-Hop Soul Party and Cut Killer Show series reached the top of the charts and brought in gold and platinum awards, Cut Killer delegated R&B to his longtime accomplice, DJ Abdel, West Coast music to the specialist DJ Cream, and gave himself a try with dancehall Ragga Killa Show, before coming back to the French sound with 1 Son 2 Rue. Over the years, Cut Killer made or produced about twenty mixed albums.

Fond of the cinema, Cut Killer mixed music in La Haine, where he played music from Édith Piaf and NTM on KRS-One's beat. Many offers followed and he signed several tracks on the OSTs of Zak Fishman's Gamer, Fred Garson's The Dancer, and Miguel Courtois' Un Ange. He signed the complete score for Fabrice Genstal's La Squale, with Herve Rakoto and Sofiane Le Cat's, followed by Le Raid (Djamel Bensallah), Trois Zéro (Fabien Onteniente), Peau d’Ange (Vincent Perez)...

In the middle of the decade, Cut Killer returned to the fundamentals of dee-jaying on radio, and after four years on Radio Nova, he joins Skyrock, where he has a weekly show the best of global hip-hop evolution. Truly an international DJ, he became the first French DJ booked in the USA through Funkmaster Flex' DJ Big Dawg Pitbulls and 50 Cent's Shadyville DJs.

Cut Killer has great versatility mixing the urban style, with rock, pop, reggae, in venues in Asia, Europe, USA, Australia bringing down barriers the barriers of language and geography.

Discography

Mixtapes

2009: New Jack Collect-or
2009: East & Fabe
2008: Tribute II
2007: Street Français 4
2007: Mixtape Trailer
2007: Psychanalyse avant l'album
2007: Summer Tour 2007
2006: Street Français 2
2006: Street Français 3
2006: Opération Freestyle Maroc 2006
2006: Evolution
2006: Un Combat Sans Fin Part 2
2005: Street Français 1
2005: Lunatic
2004: Live Milan
2003: International hustler
2003: rnb 11
2003: Summer Tour 2003
2002: 1 Son 2 Rue
2002: LIVE JAY-Z
2002: 1 son 2 rue freestyle 3
2002: New Jack réedition
2001: Triptik
2001: Ouragan
2001: RNB 9
2001: Mix du dragon
2000: Freestyle Canada
2000: comité 2 brailleur
2001: La Tempête
2001: Live Portugal
1999: HH DJ Crew
1999: Les liens sacres
1999: Live bad boy
1999: Pitt Bull Street Team
1998: Freestyle 2 vol 3 Province
1998: Freestyle 2 Vol 1 Paris
1998: Live Vevey Suisse
1998: Freestyle 2 vol 2 Banlieues
1997: Cut Killer Party Jam
1997: Afro Jazz
1997: D.Abuz Suspects
1996: Hip Hop Summer Jam 96
1996: Hip Jop Never Die
1996: Timide et Sans Compexe Boogotop
1996: Hip Hop Summer Jam
1996: La Cliqua
1996: Un Combat Sans Fin Part 2
1996: Represent
1995: Freestyle
1995: Keep It Real
1995: Cut Killer Tape 7
1995: Les Lunatics
1995: Ménage à 3
1995: Mixtape N°14
1994: 19361

Albums
2003: Hip hop Soul Party 6
2003: Party Jam
2003: Mastamorphoze
2003: HH Classics volume 1
2002: Ragga Killa Show
2002: La Rage de Dire
2002: Le Prologue
2001: Double H Dj Crew
2001: Hip Hop Soul Party 5
2001: Cut Killer Show 2
2001: R&B 2000 International
2000: Hip Hop Soul Party 4
1998: Cut Killer Show
1998: Opération Freestyle
1998: Détournement de Son
1998: Trop Loin
1998: Eastwoo
1997: Mal Partis
1996: Hip Hop Soul Party 1
1996: Hip Hop Soul Party 2
1996: Hip hop Soul Party 3

Film themes (OST)
1995 : La Haine, Matthieu Kassovitz (1 titre)
2000 : Gamer, Valentin Rousseau (3 titres)
2000 : The Dancer, Fred Garson (post synchro)
2001 : Un ange, Michel Courtois (1 titre)
2001 : La squale, Fabrice Genestal (intégralité)

Participations
2004 : Liberté d'expression 2
2005 : Comités de brailleurs

DVDs
2002 : DJ School feat. Various DJs
2004 : DVDeejay feat. Various DJs
2004 : RnB invasion
2005 : The Cut Killer Show

Clubs appearances & residences
Base Club (Dubai)
Palais (Cannes)
Boudoir (Dubai)
VIP Room (Cannes, Paris, St Tropez)
St Germain (Zurich)
Platinum (Geneva)
NOXX (Anvers)
Kiss & Fly (New York)
B Club (Moscow)
Chinawhite (London)
Pacha (Ibiza)
Pacha (Marrakech)
Bora Bora (Sousse)
Via Notte (Porto Vecchio)
Karement (Monaco)
Planches (Deauville)
Dune (Toulouse)
Macumba
Indochine (Zurich)
Bar Rouge (Shanghai)
Mix (Beijing)
Mint (Hong Kong)
Zone Club (Prishtina, Kosovo)

He also mixed for: Nike, MTV, Foot Locker, SNCF, PlayStation, Sobieski, Europa, Toyota, Première, Nintendo, Canal +, J&B, Adidas, Philips, Chaumet, Chopard, Agnès B, Puma, Louis Vuitton, Universal, Sony, Apple, Blackberry

Filmography

Actor
1995: La Haine as DJ
1998: Hang the DJ as himself
2000: The Dancer as DJ Atomic
2006: Arthur et les Minimoys as DJ Easy Low (uncredited)
2008: 9 – Un chiffre, un homme as himself

Composer
2000: La squale

See also
 List of French hip hop artists

References

External links 
DJ Cut Killer website

DJ Cut Killer radio show archive
The Global Cipha: Cut Killer Interview
Banlieu-connexion: Cut Killer Biography and Discography

French rappers
Shadyville Entertainment artists
1971 births
Living people
Moroccan expatriates in the United States
People from Meknes
Moroccan emigrants to France
Moroccan DJs
Moroccan rappers